The Saab Bofors Dynamics CBJ-MS is a personal defense weapon/submachine gun designed and manufactured by Swedish weapon developer CBJ Tech AB, and was also manufactured by Saab Bofors Dynamics.  It can be chambered for both 6.5×25mm CBJ and 9×19mm Parabellum cartridges via simple barrel changes.

, the CBJ-MS is supposedly in its final phases of development but no production date has been announced.

Development
The CBJ-MS ("Modular System") was first shown in August 2000. It is an unusual weapon in several respects, not the least because it is meant to fulfill the roles of a personal defense weapon, an assault rifle and (with the addition of a proprietary bipod and 100-round drum magazine) a squad automatic weapon. 

The gun features a top-mounted Picatinny rail for mounting optics, a progressive trigger for semi- and fully automatic fire, a collapsing wire stock, a grip safety, a threaded barrel, and a hollow foregrip which can be used to hold a spare magazine.

The CBJ-MS is capable of being field-converted to fire one of two types of ammunition. For the purely military role, the weapon fires the proprietary 6.5×25mm CBJ PDW cartridge; but by simply changing the barrel, it can fire 9×19mm Parabellum ammunition for law enforcement, training and other security operations. The 6.5×25mm CBJ cartridge has the same overall dimensions as the 9×19mm cartridge, can be used in the same magazines and generates the same level of recoil. 

It is also claimed to be effective against light vehicle armors on armoured personnel carriers (APCs). Advantages claimed for the 6.5×25mm CBJ cartridge include a high impact velocity, a high hit probability due to the flat trajectory, high energy transfer to the target, and low levels of barrel wear and corrosion. 

It is claimed that it is superior than the 5.7x28mm FN and 4.6×30mm HK round out of the FN P90 and HK MP7.

Current cartridge cases are being developed using aluminium.

References

External links
 Modern Firearms Page
 A new Weapon system from Sweden.
 http://www.military-today.com/firearms/cbj_ms.htm
 https://www.quarryhs.co.uk/PDWs.htm

Submachine guns of Sweden
Personal defense weapons
Machine pistols
Telescoping bolt submachine guns